Sir Percy Fitzgerald Nugent, 1st Baronet (29 September 1797 – 25 June 1874), was an Irish politician.

He was made a baronet on 30 September 1831, of Donore in the County of Westmeath. He was pricked High Sheriff of Longford for 1836.

Nugent was elected to the United Kingdom House of Commons as Member of Parliament for Westmeath in 1847, and held the seat until 1852.

References

External links
 

    
    
    

1797 births
1874 deaths
Baronets in the Baronetage of the United Kingdom
Members of the Parliament of the United Kingdom for County Westmeath constituencies (1801–1922)
Politicians from County Westmeath
UK MPs 1847–1852
High Sheriffs of Longford